Śmigielski  (feminine: Śmigielska , plural: Śmigielscy ) and its variants are is a Polish surname meaning someone from Śmigiel and ultimately derived from the verb śmigać, "to move swiftly". Related names include Schmiegel, Smigel and Śmigiel. Variants of the name start with Sm-, Śm-, or Szm-; may or may not contain an 'i' following the 'g'; may or may not contain an 'ł' instead of an 'l'; and end with -chi, -ski, or -szki. Historically, the family was of nobility and used the Łodzia coat of arms.

People
 Adam Śmigielski (1650–1716), Polish noble
 Adam Śmigielski (1933–2008), Polish Roman Catholic bishop
 Bogdan Śmigielski (1929–2013), Polish actor
 Bogusław Śmigielski (born 1958), Polish politician and laryngologist
 Henryk Śmigielski (1911–1993), Polish telecommunications engineer and associate professor
 Jarosław Śmigielski (1914–2002), Polish basketball player
 Jerzy Śmigielski (1890–1953), Polish officer and diplomat
 Leszek Śmigielski (1927–1994), Polish actor and director
 Octavian Smigelschi (1866–1912), Austro-Hungarian painter and printmaker
 Piotr Śmigielski (born 1989), Polish basketball player
 Robert Śmigielski (born 1966), Polish orthopedist
 Roman Śmigielski (born 1951), Polish activist, politician, journalist
 Stanisław Śmigielski (died 1618), Polish friar
 Stefan Śmigielski (1921–1990), Polish architect 
 Tadeusz Śmigielski (1913–unknown), Polish lieutenant
 Victor Smigelschi (1858–1918), Romanian friar and lecturer
 Władysław Śmigielski (1937–1995), Polish field hockey player
 Wojciech Śmigielski (1934–2017), Polish archaeologist

References

Bibliography 
 Kasper Niesiecki: Herbarz Polski (Polish Armorial), Lwów, 1738

See also
 

Polish-language surnames
Polish noble families